The 2016 Copa Libertadores Finals was the two-legged final that decided the winner of the 2016 Copa Libertadores de América, the 57th edition of the Copa Libertadores de América, South America's premier international club football tournament organized by CONMEBOL.

The finals were contested in two-legged home-and-away format between Ecuadorian team Independiente del Valle and Colombian team Atlético Nacional. The first leg was hosted by Independiente del Valle at Estadio Olímpico Atahualpa in Quito on 20 July 2016, while the second leg was hosted by Atlético Nacional at Estadio Atanasio Girardot in Medellín on 27 July 2016. The winner earned the right to represent CONMEBOL at the 2016 FIFA Club World Cup, entering at the semifinal stage, and also to play against the 2016 Copa Sudamericana winners in the 2017 Recopa Sudamericana. They also automatically qualified for the 2017 Copa Libertadores group stage.

Atlético Nacional defeated Independiente del Valle 2–1 on aggregate to win their second Copa Libertadores title.

Teams

These finals were the first ones without either an Argentine or a Brazilian team since the 1991 edition between Paraguayan team Olimpia and Chilean team Colo-Colo.

Road to the finals

Note: In all scores below, the score of the home team is given first.

Format

The finals were played on a home-and-away two-legged basis, with the higher-seeded team hosting the second leg. If tied on aggregate, the away goals rule would not be used, and 30 minutes of extra time would be played. If still tied after extra time, the penalty shoot-out would be used to determine the winner.

Matches

First leg
In the 35th minute, Orlando Berrío opened the scoring for Atlético Nacional with a low right foot shot from outside the penalty box to the right corner of the net.	
Arturo Mina got the equalizer for Independiente del Valle in the 86th minute when his header from a free-kick into the penalty box was saved but not cleared he hit the rebound low to the net.

Second leg
Miguel Borja got the only goal of the game in the 8th minute with a low right foot shot from twelve yards out after Macnelly Torres's chip into the box came back to him off the post.

References

External links
  
 Copa Libertadores 2016, CONMEBOL.com 

Finals
2016
Atlético Nacional matches
C.S.D. Independiente del Valle matches
2016 in Colombian football
2016 in Ecuadorian football
2016
2016
July 2016 sports events in South America
21st century in Quito